Donald Bisset (30 August 1910 – 10 August 1995), was an English actor. He also wrote stories for children which he mostly illustrated himself. They have been translated into 16 languages.

Selected filmography
 Murder in the Cathedral (1951) – First Priest
 Noose for a Lady (1953) – Superintendent Shelford
 The Brain Machine (1955) – Maj. Gifford, hospital superintendent
 Little Red Monkey (1955) – Editor Harris
 Up the Creek (1958) – Farm Laborer
 Broth of a Boy (1959) – Newcome
 The Headless Ghost (1959) – Guide
 Friends and Neighbours (1959) – Porter
 A Touch of Larceny (1959) – Club Member
 The Battle of the Sexes (1960) – Tobacconist
 Hide and Seek (1964) – Stranger on Platform
 Eye of the Devil (1966) – Rennard
 Jules Verne's Rocket to the Moon (1967) – Flood
 Two a Penny (1967) – Dr. Berman
 Carry On Again Doctor (1969) – Patient (uncredited)
 See No Evil (1971) – Doctor
 For the Love of Ada (1972) – Mr. Chapman
 Clinic Exclusive (1972) – Chauffeur
 Nearest and Dearest (1972) – Vicar
 The Bawdy Adventures of Tom Jones (1976) – Gentleman of the Hunt (uncredited)
 Escape from the Dark (1976)
 Warlords of Atlantis (1978) – Professor Aitken
 The Thirty Nine Steps (1978) – Renfrew
 Ragtime (1981) – J.P. Morgan
 Only Fools and Horses (1982) - A Touch of Glass - Wallace The Butler
 Little Dorrit (1987) – Enthusiastic Weighty Gentleman

Books

Anytime Stories, illus. by the author. London, Faber & Faber, 1954
Some Time Stories, illus. by the author. London, Methuen & Co., 1957
Next Time Stories, illus. by the author. London, Methuen & Co., 1959
This Time Stories, illus. by the author. London, Methuen, 1961
Another Time Stories, illus. by the author. London, Methuen, 1963
Little Bear's Pony, illus. Shirley Hughes. London, Benn, 1966
Hullo Lucy, illus. Gillian Kenny. London, Benn, 1967; as Hello Lucy!, Ernest Benn, 1969
Talks With a Tiger, illus. by the author. London, Methuen, 1967
Kangaroo Tennis, illus. B. S. Biro. London, Benn, 1968
Benjie the Circus Dog, illus. Val Biro. London, Benn, 1969
Nothing, illus. by the author. London, Benn, 1969
Upside Down Land. Moscow, Progress Publishers, 1969
Time and Again Stories (selection of stories from Some Time Stories and This Time Stories), illus. by the author. London, London, Methuen, 1970
Barcha the Tiger, illus. Derek Collard. London, Benn, 1971
Tiger Wants More, illus. by the author. London, Methuen, 1971; as Ogg, illus. Amelia Rosato. Oxford University Press, 1987
Yak and the Painted Cave, illus. Lorraine Calaora. London, Methuen, 1971
Yak and the Sea Shell, illus. Lorraine Calaora. London, Methuen, 1971
Yak and the Buried Treasure (from an idea by Susan Rutherford), illus. Lorraine Calaora. London, Methuen, 1972
Yak and the Ice Cream, illus. Lorraine Calaora. London, Methuen, 1972
Father Tingtang's Journey, illus. by the author. London, Methuen, 1973
Jenny Hopalong, illus. Derek Collard. Tonbridge & London, Benn, 1973
Yak Goes Home, illus. Lorraine Calaora. London, Methuen, 1973
The Adventures of Mandy Duck, illus. by the author. London, Methuen, 1974
The Happy Horse, illus. David Sharpe. London, Benn, 1974
Hazy Mountain, illus. Shirley Hughes. Harmondsworth, Kestrel Books, 1975
'Oh Dear', said Tiger, illus. by the author. London, Methuen, 1975
Paws with Numbers, with Michael Morris, illus. Tony Hutchings. Maidenhead, Berks., Intercontinental Books, 1976
Paws with Shapes, illus. Tony Hutchings. Maidenhead, Berks., Intercontinental Books, 1976
The Lost Birthday, illus. by the author. Moscow, Progress Publishers, 1976
Journey to the Jungle, illus. by the author. London, Beaver Books, 1977
The Story of Smokey Horse, illus. by the author. London, Methuen, 1977
This is Ridiculous, illus. by the author. London, Beaver Books, 1977
The Adventures of Yak, illus. by the author. London, Methuen, 1978
What Time Is It, When it Isn't?, illus. by the author. London, Methuen, 1980
Johnny Here and There, illus. by the author. London, Methuen Children's Books, 1981
The Hedgehog Who Rolled Uphill, illus. by the author. London, Methuen Children's Books, 1982
The Joyous Adventures of Snakey Boo, illus. by the author. London, Methuen Children's Books, 1982
Sleep Tight, Snakey Boo, illus. by the author. London, Methuen Children's Books, 1985
Upside Down Stories, with Alison Claire Darke. London, Puffin, 1987
Just a Moment!, illus. by the author. London, Methuen Children's Books, 1988
Please Yourself. London, Methuen Children's Books, 1991

References

External links

1910 births
1995 deaths
People from Brentford
British male stage actors
British male film actors
British male television actors
British children's writers
20th-century British male actors
20th-century British writers
20th-century British male writers